Allocasuarina paludosa, commonly known as the swamp sheoak or scrub sheoak, is a woody shrub of the family Casuarinaceae. It is endemic to south-eastern Australia.

References

External links
  Occurrence data for Allocasuarina paludosa from The Australasian Virtual Herbarium

paludosa
Flora of New South Wales
Flora of South Australia
Flora of Tasmania
Flora of Victoria (Australia)
Fagales of Australia